Jonathan Solomon Pila (born 1962) FRS is an Australian mathematician at the University of Oxford.

Education
Pila earned his bachelor's degree at the University of Melbourne in 1984. He was awarded a PhD from Stanford University in 1988, for research supervised by Peter Sarnak. His dissertation was entitled "Frobenius Maps of Abelian Varieties and Finding Roots of Unity in Finite Fields".  In 2010 he received an MA from Oxford.

Career and research
Pila's research interests lie in number theory and model theory. A focus has been applying the theory of o-minimality to Diophantine problems. This work began with an early paper with Enrico Bombieri, and developed through collaborations with Alex Wilkie and Umberto Zannier. The techniques obtained have led to advances in Diophantine problems, including Pila's unconditional proof of the André–Oort conjecture for powers of the modular curve. Work by Pila and Jacob Tsimerman, demonstrated the André–Oort conjecture in the case of the Siegel modular variety.

Pila has held posts at Columbia University, McGill University, the University of Bristol and (as a visiting member) the Institute for Advanced Study. Pila also took a substantial break from professional mathematics to work in his family's manufacturing business.

Pila has been the Editor of Proceedings of the Edinburgh Mathematical Society, and of Algebra and Number Theory.

Awards and honours
Pila was awarded the Clay Research Award in 2011 for his resolution of the André–Oort conjecture in the case of products of modular curves.  In June 2011, he was awarded the Senior Whitehead Prize  by the London Mathematical Society.  This prize is "awarded in recognition of work in and influence on and service to mathematics; or lecturing gifts."  Specifically, the citation recognized "his startling recent work on the Andre-Oort and Manin-Mumford conjectures. The approach he and his collaborators have developed, which combines analytic ideas with model theory, is entirely new and shows great promise for further applications." 

In addition to the Clay and London Mathematical Society awards, Pila delivered the Arf Lecture in 2011, was awarded the Leverhulme Trust Research Fellowship 2008–2010. and received the Karp Prize in 2013. Pila was elected a Fellow of the Royal Society (FRS) in 2015. In 2022 he received the Rolf Schock Prize in the category of "Mathematics".

References

1962 births
Living people
Australian mathematicians
University of Melbourne alumni
Stanford University alumni
Number theorists
Clay Research Award recipients
Tarski lecturers
Australian Fellows of the Royal Society
Academics of the University of Oxford